Alego Akomi is a Sudanese boxer. He competed in the men's light flyweight event at the 1984 Summer Olympics.

References

External links

Year of birth missing (living people)
Living people
Sudanese male boxers
Olympic boxers of Sudan
Boxers at the 1984 Summer Olympics
Place of birth missing (living people)
Light-flyweight boxers